The 2009 Division 1 was contested by 28 teams divided into two groups geographically. Degerfors IF and Östers IF won their respective groups, and were thereby qualified for play in the 2010 Superettan. IK Brage who finished second in their group were also promoted after winning their playoff.

League table

North

South

Season statistics

Young Player Teams Of The Year

At the end of each Division 1 season an all-star game is played called "Morgondagens Stjärnor" (English: "The Stars Of Tomorrow"). The two teams playing against each other consist of the best young players from each of the two leagues.

References
Sweden - List of final tables (Clas Glenning)

Swedish Football Division 1 seasons
3
Sweden
Sweden